The Battle of Amritsar was a campaign by Mukhlis Khan against Guru Hargobind and the Sikhs on 14 April 1634. The battle took place over two days and was a result of increasing tensions between the Mughal government and Guru Hargobind.

Background

After persecution from the Mughal government the Sikhs began organizing regular training exercises and became a rallying point for people disaffected by the Mughals. Increasing tensions erupted during a clash between a group of Sikh and Mughal hunting parties. On Vaisaki day, a hunting party of Sikhs set their hawk upon a royal hawk and brought it down. When the Mughal hunting party came to retrieve their hawk they used abusive language and the Sikhs then refused to part with it. This altercation led to blows and the Mughals were forced to leave after their party suffered losses. The incident with the hunting parties was used as an excuse to send out 7,000 soldiers with Mukhlis Khan to attack Guru Hargobind. The Sikhs were unprepared to face the Mughal force because of the impending marriage of Guru Hargobind's daughter.

Battle
The battle took place at Amritsar over two days. The day before the Mughals attacked, the Sikhs received information that they would be attacking and evacuated Lohgarh, a small mud fort on the outskirts of the city, except for a small garrison.  On the first day, the Mughals overwhelmed the garrison at Lohgarh but did not get further. The Mughal force also attacked the house where Guru Hargobind had been staying but did not find anything because it had been evacuated earlier.

The second day of the battle saw fierce fighting where Khalsa College, Amritsar is located now. Bhai Bhanno was killed in the fighting and Guru Hargobind took up command when he died.  The battle ended when Mukhlis Khan's head was "cleft in twain" by a blow from Guru Hargobind.

Aftermath
This was the second conflict between the Mughals and Sikhs and legitimized the affirmation of Guru Hargobind's efforts to militarize his followers. In addition, the Sikh victory destroyed the idea of Mughal invincibility and increased the Guru's support among peasants in Punjab.

References

Sources

Amritsar
Amritsar
Amritsar
1634 in India
Conflicts in 1634
1634 in the Mughal Empire